Edmund David Underwood (15 March 1928 – 25 January 1989) was an English footballer. He played for several clubs as a goalkeeper, most notably in the Football League for QPR, Watford, Liverpool and Fulham. He later player served Hastings United as a player-manager, Wealdstone as manager, and Barnet as chairman.

During his time as Barnet chairman, he helped former England international Jimmy Greaves overcome his alcohol addiction.

References

1928 births
1989 deaths
Footballers from Greater London
Association football goalkeepers
English footballers
English Football League players
Kingsbury Town F.C. players
Edgware Town F.C. players
Queens Park Rangers F.C. players
Watford F.C. players
Liverpool F.C. players
Dartford F.C. players
Dunstable Town F.C. players
Hastings United F.C. (1948) players
Barnet F.C. players
Fulham F.C. players
English football managers
Hastings United F.C. (1948) managers
Wealdstone F.C. managers